The 2009 North West 200 Races took place on Saturday 16 May 2009 at the 8.966 mile circuit, dubbed "The Triangle", based around the towns of Coleraine, Portrush and Portstewart, in Northern Ireland. The 2009 race week was the 80th anniversary of the festival, when Malcolm McQuigg, Harry Meagen and Ernie Nott picked up the race wins in 1929.

Steve Plater and William Dunlop took double victories at the meeting, with Alastair Seeley winning the other race held. Two races were cancelled due to adverse weather conditions.

Practice

Superbike
Bruce Anstey topped the timesheets on Tuesday, on his Relentless Suzuki ahead of the Hondas of John McGuinness, Keith Amor and Steve Plater. Anstey's team-mate Cameron Donald rounded out the top five, ahead of the first Yamaha of Michael Rutter and the Kawasakis of Ryan Farquhar and Conor Cummins.

In the Thursday session affected by rain, Guy Martin topped the timesheets on the Hydrex Honda CBR1000RR, just ahead of a similar bike ridden by Ian Hutchinson. Denver Robb was third on his Suzuki GSX-R1000, as times were over ten seconds slower than Tuesday.

Superstock
Carrickfergus-born Alastair Seeley dominated the first Tuesday Superstock session, setting a lap of 4:28.754, giving him an advantage of over 2.5 seconds. The lap was also good enough for the third fastest lap in the Superbike/Superstock session. Dungannon's Farquhar was second on a Kawasaki, while an all-Irish top three was completed by Kilkenny's John Walsh on his Yamaha. Cummins was fourth on his Kawasaki while William Dunlop's Yamaha rounded out the top five.

In the second session, Donald set the fastest time, just 0.7 seconds behind his team-mate Seeley, with the third Relentless Suzuki of Anstey in third.

Thursday's session was affected by adverse weather conditions, with Derek Brien topping the timesheets but was some nine seconds off the pace of Seeley. Seeley was only sixteenth in the session, as he would only set three laps in the session. Les Shand was second, just edging out another Yamaha, ridden by Michael Pearson.

Supersport
After a decent session with his 250cc bike, Michael Dunlop surprised the rest of the field by setting the fastest lap in the Tuesday Supersport session. His 4:33.664 lap was over a second and a half faster than the next best lap, by Plater on the HM Plant Honda. Amor was third ahead of Anstey, Ian Hutchinson, William Dunlop and McGuinness.

Thursday's session was cancelled due to adverse weather conditions.

250cc
Sunny conditions marked the start of the 250cc session on Tuesday, in which Christian Elkin topped the timesheets. Elkin's Honda lapped the circuit in a time of 5:02.594, edging out defending race winner Michael Dunlop's Honda by just over a tenth of a second. McGuinness was third, with a lap of 5:05.326, narrowly shading another Honda, ridden by Belfast's Mark Lunney. The first Yamaha rounded out the top five, with David Craig edging out Darren Burns.

Thursday's session was completed before adverse weather conditions curtailed the day. Elkin continued his good form, with a lap of 4:56.654, nearly eight seconds faster than the next competitor. Denver Robb was second, ahead of McGuinness and Phil Harvey. Paul Robinson rounded out the top five on his Honda.

125cc
The only Aprilia in the field topped the Tuesday timesheets, with Ballywalter's David Lemon riding it to a lap of 5:20.756 and the only 100 mph lap of the session. Although, William Dunlop recorded a 100 mph lap, he did not complete enough laps to qualify. Lemon's time was good enough to give him a three-second advantage over Oliver Linsdell's Honda, with Chris Palmer, Paul Robinson and James Ford, all on Hondas, rounding out the top five.

Thursday's session was completed before adverse weather conditions curtailed the day. William Dunlop topped the session, improving on his non-qualifying time from Tuesday, but was still over a second shy from the best time of the week, set by Lemon. Lemon was only fourth in the session, with Palmer and Robinson both slotting in between.

Races

Race 1; 250cc Race final standings 
Saturday 16 May 2009 3 laps – 26.79 miles

Fastest Lap: Michael Dunlop, 4'55.591 on lap 2

Race 2; Superbike Race Race final standings 
Saturday 16 May 2009 2 laps – 17.862 miles

Fastest Lap: Steve Plater, 4'22.577 on lap 2

Race 3; Supersport Race final standings 
Saturday 16 May 2009 4 laps – 35.725 miles

Fastest Lap: Steve Plater, 4' 33.126 on lap 2

Race 4; 125cc Race final standings 
Saturday 16 May 2009 4 laps – 35.864 miles

Fastest Lap: William Dunlop, 5' 18.482 on lap 2

Race 5; Superstock Race final standings 
Saturday 16 May 2009 2 laps – 17.862 miles

Fastest Lap: Alastair Seeley, 4' 27.40 on lap 2

Notes
 The final two races of the day were cancelled due to adverse weather conditions.
 There were a number of serious crashes during the week. Firstly, during the Supersport session on Tuesday, John Anderton fell off his bike at around 120 mph at Station Corner, and suffered leg and head injuries. During a restart of the opening race of Saturday, Christian Elkin crashed out while battling Michael Dunlop for the lead. Both riders fell and Dunlop ploughed into the Macclesfield rider. Elkin suffered a broken leg in the incident. In the original start of that particular race, Cookstown's Mark Young fell off at Mather's Cross, the infamous corner that killed Robert Dunlop at the 2008 North West 200 Races. Young was taken to hospital with internal injuries, Sadly, he would succumb to his injuries to become the fourteenth fatality in the history of the North West 200. An inquiry into the accident is under way.

See also
North West 200 – History and results from the event

References

External links 
 Official website
 Map of "The Triangle"

2009
North West
North West
North